Matthew Meadows (born September 5, 1938) is an American retired educator and Democratic politician who served as a member of both chambers of the Florida Legislature.

Early life and education 
Meadows was born in Fort Pierce, Florida. He received his Bachelor of Science degree from Bethune-Cookman College in 1961 and was later awarded an Honorary Doctorate of Divinity.

Career 
He was first elected to the Florida House of Representatives in 2000 and served four successive terms. Meadows was unable to seek re-election in 2008 due to term limits. He served in the Florida Senate from 1992 to 1998.

During his time in the Senate, Meadows was a part of the effort to pay reparations to the descendants of the victims of the Rosewood massacre. This bill made Florida one of the first states to tackle the issue of monetary amends for past racial violence.

Personal life 
Meadows is married to Charley Mae Harris, a native of Macon, Georgia. He and his wife have five children.

References

External links
Florida House of Representatives Profile, myfloridahouse.gov. Accessed November 4, 2022.
Rosewood, Florida massacre - racial violence reparations, theguardian.com. Accessed November 4, 2022.

|-

Democratic Party members of the Florida House of Representatives
1938 births
Living people